psake is a domain-specific language and build automation tool written in PowerShell to create builds using a dependency pattern similar to Rake or MSBuild. It intends to simplify the build language as compared to MSBuild scripting.

Overview
A build script consists of Tasks. Each Task is a function that can define dependencies on other Task functions.

The following is an example psake script:

Task default -Depends Build

Task Build -Depends Init,Clean,Compile {
   "build"
}

Task Compile -Depends Clean, Init {
   "compile"
}

Task Clean -Depends Init {
   "clean"
}

Task Init {
   "init"
}

psake executes the Task functions and enforces the dependencies between tasks. Since psake is written in a real programming language and not XML, you have a lot more freedom and flexibility in your build scripts.  You can use all the features of PowerShell and the .NET Framework within your build.

The output of running psake on the script above is shown below:

PS  > .\psake.ps1 default.ps1
Executing task: Init
init
Executing task: Clean
clean
Executing task: Compile
compile
Executing task: Build
compile

Build Succeeded!

----------------------------------------------------------------------
Build Time Report
----------------------------------------------------------------------
Name    Duration
----    --------
Init    00:00:00.0140878
Clean   00:00:00.0113634
Compile 00:00:00.0334894
Build   00:00:00.1288015
Total:  00:00:00.4693739

History 
 May 2008 - psake originally written by James Kovacs as a PowerShell V1 script file
 May 2009 - psake re-written as a PowerShell V2 module by Jorge Matos

References

External links 
 
 psake ReadTheDocs
 psake NuGet package

Domain-specific programming languages
Programming tools
Build automation
Software using the MIT license